The Custody of Infants Act 1873 (36 & 37 Vict. c. 12) was an Act of the Parliament of the United Kingdom. It was signed into law on 24 April 1873.

Section 1 allowed the Court of Chancery to order that a mother would have access to, or custody of, any infants under sixteen years of age; or to order that any such infants in her custody were to remain so subject to any regulations for the access of the father or guardian.

Section 2 provided that no agreement in a deed of separation between the father and mother was to be held invalid simply for providing that the custody or control of the children lay with the mother, with the important caveat that no court was bound to enforce any such agreement if it felt it would not be to the benefit of the infant.

Section 3 repealed the Custody of Infants Act 1839.

In Ireland, the Act was repealed by the Guardianship of Infants Act 1964 (section 4).

References

External links 
 Chronological table of the statutes; HMSO, London. 1993. 
 http://www.parliament.uk/about/living-heritage/transformingsociety/private-lives/relationships/overview/custodyrights/

United Kingdom Acts of Parliament 1873
Family law in the United Kingdom